Ludwik Wróblewski (4 February 1814 – 10 September 1870) was a Polish noble, physician and a Doctor of Medicine.

Biography 
Ludwik Wróblewski was born to a wealthy family of Ślepowron coat of arms. He was the youngest son of Franciszek Wróblewski and Zofia Wróblewska (née Szytler). He earned M.D. degree in Medicine. For his merit he was awarded Order of Saint Anna by Emperor Nicholas I of Russia.

He had at least one child - son Józef, who was the father of Bronisław Wróblewski and grandfather of Polish painter Andrzej Wróblewski.

Ludwik Wróblewski was buried at Rasos Cemetery.

See also
 Wróblewski (Ślepowron)

Notes

1814 births
1870 deaths
Physicians from Vilnius
19th-century Polish nobility
Ludwik
Recipients of the Order of St. Anna
Burials at Rasos Cemetery